Mark Leslie Norton (February 7, 1956 – April 5, 2007), better known as Mark St. John, was an American guitarist best known for his brief stint with the hard rock band Kiss from April to November 1984. His work can be heard on the band's 1984 album Animalize and their 2023 live album Off the Soundboard: Poughkeepsie, NY. He also co-founded the glam metal band White Tiger.

St. John died suddenly under murky circumstances in early April 2007, several months after being badly beaten during a brief stay in an Orange County jail.

Career

Prior to Kiss
Before joining Kiss, St. John was a well-known and respected teacher, and a guitarist for the Southern California cover band Front Page.  After leaving Kiss, he formed a band called White Tiger, featuring David Donato (lead vocals), his brother Michael Norton (bass/backing vocals), and Brian James Fox (drums). Demos that the band had recorded with producer Andy Johns and guitarist Neil Citron, prior to St. John joining, apparently led to Donato's equally short tenure with the band Black Sabbath.

Kiss

St. John was with Kiss only a short time but was featured on the album Animalize, the second album of the non-makeup period. This turned out to be one of Kiss' most successful studio albums, aside from those made by the original lineup. St. John's only video appearance with Kiss is in the video for the hit single "Heaven's on Fire".

During the sessions for the album, which was recorded in mid-1984, St. John clashed with the other members of the band. According to Paul Stanley, they had difficulty putting together solos, with Stanley saying that St. John had trouble playing the same thing twice. Stanley also said that he had to dub in certain parts during St. John's solos to make them work better with the song.

St. John developed reactive arthritis, which caused his hands and arms to swell. He was all but unable to perform live as a member of Kiss, and played only two full shows and one partial show during the Animalize tour, with Bruce Kulick playing the rest. St. John was officially replaced by Kulick on December 8, 1984.

He is the only member of Kiss not to appear on any album front cover, as the Animalize cover features only a tapestry of animal prints. However, he is posing with the rest of the band on the album's back cover.

After Kiss
In January 1985 St. John teamed up with vocalist David Donato and drummer Barry Brandt of Angel to work on developing some demo ideas. By March he was playing live again, appearing at an all-star jam session at the FM Station Club. The lineup included Rudy Sarzo and Tommy Aldridge (Kiss Revolution, April/May 1985). St. John also performed at a sold-out audience at a benefit jazz concert for Greenpeace. Some of the musicians playing alongside St. John included the Steve Hooks Band, Stu Nevitt (Shadowfax), Slyde Hyde (Tom Scott/Supertramp), Al Aarons (Count Basie), plus other special all-star guests.

St. John and Donato soon formed White Tiger. They had written most of the material for the album by mid-1985 and set out to complete a lineup with which to record. The band also included St. John's younger brother, Michael, on bass, but was completed with the addition of Brian James Fox on drums. While the independent release did well on that level selling some 50,000 copies, and the band gigged around California, White Tiger joined up with Garry Lane owner of Logic Productions who promoted many top bands in LA. St. John and Lane became good friends meeting for a second time at Trojan Studios in Garden Grove, California. That is where St. John and Lane came up with the idea to play the legendary club known as The Hot Spot located in Huntington Beach, California, owned by Gennie Gromet (who was the ex-wife of Dick Dale from the band Dick Dale and the Del-Tones). The band did not manage to break and split while working on demos for a second album in 1988. St. John teamed up with Jeff Scott Soto in 1988 to make a demo. St. John also did some session work performing lead guitar on "Livin' for My Lord" on Ken Tamplin's 1990 album, Axe to Grind. Tamplin is an inspirational Christian rocker more famed for his involvement in the band Shout. Tamplin has also co-written material with Gene Simmons of Kiss. St. John also worked with former Knight Rider star David Hasselhoff, even appearing in his video, "Is Everyone Happy".

St. John made a demo in 1990 with fellow former Kiss member Peter Criss. This band, known as the Keep, became what was essentially White Tiger, with Criss replacing Brian Fox on drums, and David Donato replacing original vocalist David MacDonald. This lineup performed live just once, on May 2, 1990, at a drum clinic at the Guitar Center music store in Lawndale, California.

When the band started shopping their demo (credited as Peter Criss) around the response was universally negative. One cassette demo to circulate simply featured "Love for Sale", "Long Time", and "All Night Long", though they had also covered Lee Michaels' 1971 hit "Do You Know What I Mean", and had other original material such as "Between the Lines". By early 1991, the difficulty shopping the demo, and St. John's need to get on with making a living, led to friction between Criss and him, and he left the band (which eventually became Criss).

He was in a short-lived band with Phil Naro called the Mark St. John Project that released a limited edition EP in 1999, and he also made an appearance at a Kiss expo in New Jersey. He later released an all-instrumental CD in 2003 called Magic Bullet Theory.

In later years, St. John did not make many public appearances. In 2023 Kiss announced they would release the only known full live show recording featuring St. John as part of their Off the Soundboard series of live albums. The show was recorded on November 28, 1984 at Mid-Hudson Civic Center in Poughkeepsie, New York.

Declining health and death
Beginning on September 14, 2006, St. John was incarcerated for several days at Theo Lacy Jail in Orange County, California, after being charged with possession of unspecified drug paraphernalia, attempted destruction of evidence, and resisting arrest. He was initially housed at the facility's D Barracks, a medium-security dormitory for nonviolent offenders.  He was later moved to F-West Barracks after telling guards he had stolen crackers from another inmate's property box and was in fear for his safety. A guard allegedly conspired with a group of inmates to have St. John assaulted for the transgression, and subsequently St. John was brutally beaten and stabbed with pencils by a group of up to 20 inmates. The guard was later placed on paid leave pending an investigation into this and other violent incidents inside the jail. In an interview with the OC Weekly, a fellow inmate described St. John's encounter: 
He got caught stealing something. I guess he did that somewhere else in the jail, but we found out about it somehow. . . . The Kiss guy got beat up pretty bad.
His girlfriend, who said he was unrecognizable after the vicious beating, believed the incident was directly responsible for his untimely death several months later. A couple of days before the beating, St. John told her that he had "snitched" on a drug dealer several years earlier, and he believed he was certain to be attacked if this became known by the other inmates.

For the next several months after leaving Theo Lacy Jail, St. John suffered severe headaches and body aches and many times told his girlfriend that the chronic ailments were absolutely the result of the beating at Theo Lacy. While it is not known what medical attention he received inside the jail, after his release he refused to see a doctor due to having no medical insurance, and thus his health deteriorated. St. John died on April 5, 2007, due to what the coroner described as a brain hemorrhage brought on by an accidental overdose of methamphetamine.

Friends claimed that St. John was never the same after the beating and would not discuss his brief time at Theo Lacy Jail. Another friend stated that St. John fell deep into depression and drug addiction after being released, selling all his outfits, and mowing lawns and doing roofing to afford a drug habit that spiraled out of control.

References

General sources

External links
[ Allmusic Mark St. John biography]
Billboard.com article about St. John's death
Kissinuk Mark St. John 2003 interview
Mark St. John At Find A Grave

1956 births
2007 deaths
American heavy metal guitarists
American rock guitarists
American male guitarists
Glam metal musicians
Kiss (band) members
Lead guitarists
White Tiger (band) members
20th-century American musicians
Burials at Rose Hills Memorial Park
20th-century American guitarists
20th-century American male musicians